Erwin Koppe (born 29 March 1938) is a German former gymnast. He competed at the 1960 and 1964 Summer Olympics in all artistic gymnastics events and won a bronze medal with the German team in 1964. Individually his best achievement was 14th place on the parallel bars in 1964. He won one more bronze team medal at the world championships in 1966.

References

1938 births
Living people
People from Rosenheim
Sportspeople from Upper Bavaria
German male artistic gymnasts
Olympic gymnasts of the United Team of Germany
Gymnasts at the 1960 Summer Olympics
Gymnasts at the 1964 Summer Olympics
Olympic bronze medalists for the United Team of Germany
Olympic medalists in gymnastics
Medalists at the 1964 Summer Olympics
Medalists at the World Artistic Gymnastics Championships
20th-century German people
21st-century German people